Machaeranthera is a genus of North American flowering plants in the family Asteraceae which are known by the common name tansyaster.

Tansyasters are variable in appearance. Some are small, singular wildflowers, while others are sprawling shrubs. Several species easily hybridize with each other, as well, making identification difficult. In general, members of the genus may be identified by the sharp-pointed, dagger-shaped anthers in the disc florets at the center of the flower. The flower heads are usually daisylike, and are usually a shade of purple or blue, but may be pink, yellow, or white. Tansyasters are native to western North America.

The genus Machaeranthera is distinguished from the genus Dieteria by having once- or twice-pinnate leaves, whereas Dieteria has entire to toothed leaves.

Machaeranthera means "swordlike anthers".

 Species

References

External links
 Jepson Manual Treatment
 USDA Plants Profile

Astereae
Asteraceae genera